The 1976 October Revolution Parade was a parade on Moscow's Red Square on November 7th, 1976, dedicated to the 59th anniversary of the October Revolution. The parade marked the last appearance of Politburo member Nikolai Podgorny. Newly appointed Soviet Defense Minister Dmitry Ustinov greeted armed battalions while the parade was commanded by Moscow Military District, Colonel General Vladimir Govorov. Nikolay Mikhaylov conducted the Combined Orchestra of the Moscow Garrison which provided the music for the parade. General Secretary of the Communist Party of the Soviet Union Leonid Brezhnev and other high-ranking officials within the Communist Party of the Soviet Union spectated the parade from the grandstand of Lenin's Mausoleum. Although military vehicles were present, there was no display of tanks.

See also 

 October Revolution

External links 

 Footage of the parade (Main)
 Footage of the parade (Workers' demonstration and finale)

References 

November 1976 events in Europe
1976 in Moscow
1976 in the Soviet Union
October Revolution parades